Mohinder Singh (3 April 1953 – 20 September 1977) was an Indian field hockey player. He was part of the Indian team that won the 1975 Men's Hockey World Cup. He also competed in the men's tournament at the 1976 Summer Olympics and in the 1970 Asian Games where he did not appear in any matches.

Gill worked in the Punjab Police as a sub inspector. He died in the Civil Hospital, Jalandhar "after a short illness"  The report of his death gives his age as 26.

References

External links
 

1953 births
1977 deaths
Indian male field hockey players
Olympic field hockey players of India
Field hockey players at the 1976 Summer Olympics
Field hockey players from Jalandhar
Asian Games medalists in field hockey
Asian Games silver medalists for India
Medalists at the 1970 Asian Games
Field hockey players at the 1970 Asian Games